William Edwards Blackmon (born October 27, 1984) is a former American football safety and return specialist. He played college football for the Boston College Eagles, and was drafted in the fourth round of the 2006 NFL Draft by the Green Bay Packers. He has also played for the New York Giants, Seattle Seahawks, Jacksonville Jaguars, Washington Redskins, and briefly for the Saskatchewan Roughriders of the Canadian Football League.

Early life
Blackmon was born in Providence, Rhode Island but grew up in Cranston. He was raised by his father and grandmother after his mother died from Crohn's disease when he was 6 years old.

Blackmon attended Bishop Hendricken High School in Warwick, Rhode Island. At Hendricken, Blackmon earned 2001 All-America first-team honors from USA Today, ESPN.com, SuperPrep and PrepStar as a senior. He was named Gatorade Rhode Island Player of the Year after his senior season. Blackmon excelled in basketball and track; he won the 100-meter dash in the Rhode Island state meet with a time of 10.87 seconds.

Professional career

Green Bay Packers
Blackmon had a 57-yard punt return touchdown and a fumble-return touchdown as the Green Bay Packers wrapped up the NFC North title with a 38-7 win on December 10, 2007 over the Oakland Raiders. They were the first and second touchdowns of his career.  He became just the fourth player in NFL history to accomplish the feat of a kick and fumble return in the same game, and the first since 1974. In 9 games, he recorded 4 solo tackles and a pass deflected.

In the first game of his 2008 season with the Packers, Blackmon returned a punt 76 yards for a touchdown against the Minnesota Vikings. He was later named NFC Special Teams Player of the Week for Week 1.

In week 10 of the 2008 NFL season, against the Minnesota Vikings once again, Blackmon returned a punt 65 yards for a touchdown.

Blackmon was released on an injury settlement from the Packers during 2010 roster cutdowns.

New York Giants
Blackmon signed with the New York Giants on October 29, 2010. After being placed on injured reserve, the Giants waived Blackmon on January 2, 2011. Then on November 23, 2011, after the Giants secondary got depleted with injuries, Blackmon re-signed with the team. He won a Super Bowl ring when the Giants defeated the New England Patriots in Super Bowl XLVI. He was released in the off-season and was signed by the Arizona Rattlers of the Arena Football League but never played for them.

Seattle Seahawks
On February 13, 2013, Blackmon signed with the Seattle Seahawks. He was released by the team on August 27, 2013.

Jacksonville Jaguars
On August 28, 2013, Blackmon was signed by the Jacksonville Jaguars. On November 10, 2013, in a game against the Tennessee Titans, he caused and recovered a Ryan Fitzpatrick fumble and returned it 21 yards for a touchdown, helping the Jaguars secure their first win of the season. He was released on February 26, 2015.

Seattle Seahawks (second stint)
On March 9, 2015, Blackmon signed a deal to return to the Seattle Seahawks. He was released for final roster cuts before the start of the season on September 6, 2015.

Washington Redskins
Blackmon signed a one-year contract with the Washington Redskins on September 15, 2015. After testing the free agency market for the 2016 offseason, Blackmon re-signed with the Redskins on a two-year contract on March 14, 2016. Early in the 2016 offseason, the Redskins moved him from the cornerback position to free safety. He recorded his first interception of the season against Chicago Bears quarterback Matt Barkley in the team's Week 16 win.

On September 2, 2017, Blackmon was released by the Redskins.

Saskatchewan Roughriders
On July 24, 2018, Blackmon signed with the Saskatchewan Roughriders of the Canadian Football League. He was cut from the team's roster on July 30, 2018.   Blackmon was then activated by the Saskatchewan Roughriders and made his CFL debut as starting corner on September 2, 2018 in a win over the Winnipeg Blue Bombers, in which he recorded 4 tackles and forced one fumble. It was Blackmon's only game in the CFL; he retired shortly afterwards and accepted a job on NFL Network.  He served as a studio analyst for Sky Sports UK telecasts for weeks 1 through 8 of the 2019 NFL season.

References

External links

Official website
Boston College Eagles profile
Jacksonville Jaguars bio
Washington Redskins bio

1984 births
Living people
Bishop Hendricken High School alumni
Sportspeople from Cranston, Rhode Island
Players of American football from Providence, Rhode Island
Sportspeople from Providence, Rhode Island
American football cornerbacks
American football safeties
American football wide receivers
American football return specialists
Boston College Eagles football players
Green Bay Packers players
New York Giants players
Arizona Rattlers players
Seattle Seahawks players
Jacksonville Jaguars players
Washington Redskins players
Saskatchewan Roughriders players
Canadian football defensive backs
American players of Canadian football